Grimpoteuthis pacifica is an octopus known from one badly damaged specimen. It's not completely described, and it's not easily separated from some other species of octopus. Nothing clearly differentiates G. pacifica from Grimpoteuthis hippocrepium except for its type locality.

Description and habitat

The specimen was captured off Papua New Guinea in the South Pacific Ocean, more specifically in the Coral Sea, where it was 4,500 meters below sea level. Grimpoteuthis pacifica is probably demersal.

Its fins are 55 millimeters long. Each arm has 52 suckers, the largest of which are 2.5 millimeters across. Its arms range in length from 130 millimeters long to 170 millimeters long, and its eyes are very large.

The octopus is a deep purple color, though some parts are paler.

References

Octopuses
Molluscs of the Pacific Ocean
Molluscs described in 1885
Species known from a single specimen